Longbottom is an English surname; notable persons with the name include:

Arthur Longbottom (footballer) (born 1933), English footballer
Arthur Longbottom (politician) (1883–1943), Labour Party politician in the United Kingdom
Bruce Longbottom (born 1964), Australian professional rugby league footballer
Charles Longbottom (1930–2013), British barrister, businessman and politician
George Longbottom (born 1961), Australian rugby league player
Julia Longbottom (born 1963), British diplomat and Ambassador of the United Kingdom to Japan
Kevin Longbottom (1940–1986), Aboriginal Australian professional rugby league footballer
Kieran Longbottom (born 1985), Australian rugby union footballer
Maggie Longbottom, married name Margaret Wintringham (1879–1955), British Liberal Party politician
Maurice Longbottom (born 1995), Australian rugby league and rugby union player
Maurice Longbottom (RAF officer)  Spitfire photo reconnaissance pioneer
Peter Longbottom (1959–1998), British cyclist
Robert Longbottom (born 1957), New York City-based director, choreographer and director
Will Longbottom (born 1998), English professional footballer

Fictional characters
Longbottom family in J.K.Rowling's Harry Potter series
Alice Longbottom
Frank Longbottom
Augusta Longbottom
Neville Longbottom

See also
Longbottom, a region of the Shire in J. R. R. Tolkien's fictional Middle-earth
Bottom (surname)